Lookin' on the Bright Side is an album by pianist Harold Mabern which was originally released on the DIW label in Japan in 1993.

Reception
The Allmusic review by Ken Dryden awarded the album 4 stars noting that "Harold Mabern was nearing his 57th birthday around the time of the two 1993 studio sessions that provided the music for this Japanese release; he's clearly in a mood to celebrate... Highly recommended for hard bop fans".

Track listing 
All compositions by Harold Mabern except as indicated.
 "Look on the Bright Side" - 5:33   
 "Moment's Notice" (John Coltrane) - 5:20   
 "Big Time Cooper" - 8:00   
 "Au Privave" (Charlie Parker) - 6:08   
 "Love Is a Many Splendored Thing" (Sammy Fain, Paul Francis Webster) - 5:08   
 "It's a Lonesome Old Town" (Charles Kisco, Harry Tobias) - 9:19   
 "Too Late to Fall Back Baby" - 6:52   
 "Our Waltz" (David Rose) - 4:22

Personnel 
 Harold Mabern – piano
 Christian McBride – bass
 Jack DeJohnette – drums

References

1993 albums
DIW Records albums
Harold Mabern albums